The Electronic Literature Organization (ELO) is a nonprofit organization "established in 1999 to promote and facilitate the writing, publishing, and reading of electronic literature". It hosts annual conferences, awards annual prizes for works of and criticism of electronic literature, hosts online events and has published a series of collections of electronic literature.

History

Founding and early years (1999-2002) 
The ELO was founded in 1999 in Chicago by Scott Rettberg, Robert Coover, and Jeff Ballowe. Rettberg took the role as CEO, and Ballowe was president. In a book chapter about this early phase, Rettberg describes the first three years as a "turbulent and exciting period". 

An article in the Los Angeles Times in describes the first reading organised by the ELO in July 2000, "a recent evening at the home of Microsoft executive Richard Bangs", with "trays of light finger food and delicately chilled Chardonnay" with "guests from high-tech east side Seattle mingled with representatives of the old-guard arts establishment and half a dozen writers of new fiction who had come to read from their work". 

The new organization was able to ride the excitement of the tech industry during the dot-com bubble, but also suffered from the subsequent crash.

Transition to academic hosts (2002-2008) 
The ELO had early successes in obtaining funding from individuals in the technology industry and the Ford Foundation (which funded the Electronic Literature Symposium at UCLA in 2002) and the Rockefeller Foundation (which funded work on the Electronic Literature Directory). However, the dot com crash made funding dry up, and despite some local funding in Chicago, the organization had to transition from having full-time staff and an office to being hosted by universities. In 2001 the ELO moved to UCLA, supported by the English department. Marjorie Luesebrink became president, N. Katherine Hayles was faculty advisor, and Jessica Pressman was the managing director. The organization has since been hosted by universities, including the University of Maryland, College Park in 2006 where it was supported by the Maryland Institute for Technology in the Humanities (under the direction of Matthew Kirschenbaum), and MIT under the leadership of Nick Montfort.

2008-present 
Since the 2007 conference, the ELO has grown annually and by 2015 was gathering hundreds of people at each of its conferences.

Leadership 
Past presidents of the ELO include Jeff Ballowe, Scott Rettberg (as Executive Director), Marjorie Luesebrink, Matthew Kirschenbaum, Joseph Tabbi, Nick Montfort, Dene Grigar, and Leonardo Flores. Caitlin Fisher became president in July 2022.

Conferences 
The ELO holds annual conferences that include both scholarly presentations and exhibitions and performances of electronic literature. The ELO website contains an archive of past conference websites.

Publications 

 Four volumes of the Electronic Literature Collection have been published, in 2006, 2011, 2016 and 2022. 
 The Electronic Literature Directory is a database of works of electronic literature.
 Two reports on the preservation of electronic literature were published in 2004 and 2005 by the ELO as part of the Preservation, Archiving, and Dissemination (PAD) project.
 A book series called Electronic Literature with Bloomsbury.
 Pathfinders, a documentation of the experience of early digital literature.

Awards

The 2001 Electronic Literature Awards 
In 2001 the ELO announced the Electronic Literature Awards, with a $10,000 prize (funded by ZDNet) for the best work of fiction and the best work of poetry. 163 works were submitted, and each was reviewed by at least three people on the board, after which the highest scoring works were passed on to judges Larry McCaffery and Heather McHugh. Rettberg notes that the diversity of works submitted and shortlisted was "an eye-opener (..) in terms of what I might consider 'fiction' and 'poetry' to be in the e-lit context'.

In 2001, These Waves of Girls by Caitlin Fisher won the fiction prize and windsound by John Cayley won the poetry prize. The excitement of the era can be felt in an interview by the cable television channel TechTV with Fisher after the awards gala in New York.

ELO Awards (2014-) 
After a pause due to a lack of funding, the ELO Awards were rekindled in 2014, and since then an annual award has been given to the best literary work and the best work of scholarship on electronic literature. Each award comes with a $1000 stipend.

Robert Coover Award for a Work of Electronic Literature 
This award honors the year’s best work of electronic literature, of any form or genre.

N. Katherine Hayles Award for Criticism of Electronic Literature 
This award honors the best work of criticism of electronic literature of any length.

Marjorie C. Luesebrink Career Achievement Award 
This award honors a visionary artist and/or scholar who has brought excellence to the field of electronic literature and has inspired others to help create and build the field.

References

External links

Electronic Literature Directory

Electronic literature
Literary societies